İnceçay can refer to:

 İnceçay, Kargı
 İnceçay, Şenkaya